Muhammad Adil Siddiqui (12 May 1963 – 30 November 2020) was a Pakistani politician who had been a Member of the Provincial Assembly of Sindh, from May 2013 to May 2018.

Early life and education
He was born 12 May 1963, in Karachi.

He has a degree of Bachelor of Arts from Karachi University.

Political career
He was elected to the Provincial Assembly of Sindh as a candidate of Mutahida Quami Movement from Constituency PS-100 KARACHI-XII in 2013 Pakistani general election.

Death
He died from COVID-19 at Karachi Private Hospital on 30 November 2020, during the COVID-19 pandemic in Pakistan.

References

1963 births
2020 deaths
Sindh MPAs 2013–2018
Muttahida Qaumi Movement politicians
People from Karachi
University of Karachi alumni
Deaths from the COVID-19 pandemic in Islamabad